Gradišče v Tuhinju is a small settlement in the Tuhinj Valley in the Municipality of Kamnik in the Upper Carniola region of Slovenia. It includes the hamlet of Hom (in older sources also Holm).

Name
The name of the settlement was changed from Gradišče to Gradišče v Tuhinju in 1953.

References

External links 
Gradišče v Tuhinju on Geopedia

Populated places in the Municipality of Kamnik